Ben Stahl (1915–1998) was an American political activist of working class interests.

Education
After graduating from Central High School in 1932, he entered Temple University, studied briefly at Gratz College, and became a leader of the Young People's Socialist League before receiving his B.A. in History from Temple in 1936. Immediately after graduation he took a job as a teacher with the Works Progress Administration's Workers' Education Program.  He joined the American Federation of Teachers and became the secretary of his local before the age of 22.

Early career
From 1940 until 1942 he worked for the Pennsylvania Department of Public Assistance as a social worker.  He married Evelyn Miller in 1942 and in 1943 he took on the role of National Representative with the Congress of Industrial Organizations' (CIO) Department of Organization.  Working with the CIO to organize workers in the railroad, telephone, government, social work, brewing, jewelry, and education sectors would take him and his wife around the country from Boston to Los Angeles.  Ben continued to work as a field organizer through the merger of the American Federation of Labor with the CIO in 1955 (mergers of local affiliates proceeded slowly over the next decade in Philadelphia).  He and his family eventually returned to Philadelphia in 1959, where in 1962 he began the long three-year fight to win the Philadelphia Federation of Teachers and cafeteria workers collective bargaining rights.  At victory, the new local became the largest in the state.

Ben Stahl worked until 1969 as a field organizer for the AFL-CIO, when he became the Regional Director of the AFL-CIO's Human Resources Development Institute.  He held this position until retirement in July 1982.  In 1986 Mayor Wilson Goode appointed him Commissioner of the Philadelphia Commission on Human Relations.

Throughout his working years and well into retirement he involved himself with numerous historical, labor, human rights, and civic organizations, which include:

Jewish Groups
Jewish Labor Committee
Jewish Employment and Vocational Service

Labor Unions
Communications Workers of America Local 189
Garment Industry Board of Philadelphia
Philadelphia Federation of Teachers
United Farm Workers
Labor Union Bicentennial

Philadelphia Regional Civic Associations
La Communidad Hispana: Project Mushroom, El Centro Esperanza
Greater Philadelphia First Corporation
Greater Philadelphia Urban Affairs Coalition
Philadelphia Unemployment Project
Regional Council of Neighborhood Organizations

Social Service Groups
Offender Aid and Restoration
People's Emergency Center
Vocational Education (ACCE)

See also

References

Ben Stahl's Papers may be accessed at the Urban Archives at Temple University
Accessions 756 and 952.  Some copyright photographs are available in Photographic Collection PC-49 Box 14 Folder 7.  Philadelphia Bulletin clipping files and electronic editions of the Philadelphia Inquirer and Daily News contain additional source material.

More materials about Ben Stahl are available at Ben Stahl's homepage. There is a picture, his obit, a history he wrote of the Philadelphia AFL-CIO Human Rights Committee and a memorial by his elder son, Gerry Stahl.

1915 births
1998 deaths
Political activists from Pennsylvania
Temple University alumni
American Federation of Teachers people
Works Progress Administration workers
Central High School (Philadelphia) alumni